Every Single Day may refer to:

 Every Single Day (Luni Coleone and Cool Nutz album), 2007
 Every Single Day (Lucy Kaplansky album), 2001
 Every Single Day: Complete Bonnie Pink (1995–2006)
 "Every Single Day" (Felix Sandman song), a 2018 song by Felix Sandman
 "Every Single Day" (Rob Mills song), a 2003 song by Rob Mills
 Every Single Day (band), South Korean band
 "Every Single Day", a song by Dodgy
 "Every Single Day" from Let the Love Go On